Tui Tamara Sutherland (born July 31, 1978 in Caracas, Venezuela) is an American children's book author who has written more than 50 books under her own name and under several pen names. In 2009, she appeared as a contestant on Jeopardy!, becoming a two-day champion and winning a grand total of $46,200. Sutherland's books have sold over 15 million copies; she is best known for writing the Wings of Fire series of dragon fantasy novels.

Early life, education and literary career 
Tui T. Sutherland was born on July 31, 1978 in Caracas. Her mother, who was from New Zealand, named her after the tui, a bird native to that country. Sutherland lived in Asuncion, Miami, and Santo Domingo for short periods before moving to New Jersey in high school. While in high school she began doing theater, mostly backstage work. She obtained a Bachelor of Arts in English Literature from Williams College in 1998, writing her college thesis about Ophelia from William Shakespeare's Hamlet, then earned a Master of Arts in Art History. 

Sutherland abandoned ideas of a career in theater in favor of writing children's books after "she partook in creative writing courses over six months in New Zealand", a decision she half-joked allowed her career path "to be more far stable and lucrative". 

Sutherland began her professional literary career as an editor in Brooklyn, New York, at Grosset & Dunlap, then at HarperCollins; she rose to initial notoriety after becoming a member of the Erin Hunter team alongside Victoria Holmes, Kate Cary and Cherith Baldry on the popular Warriors and Seekers series, from the perspective of cats and bears respectively. Her initial success during this time, coupled with what she learned about the inside workings of the publishing industry, helped her build the courage to publish books of her own and to eventually quit her position as an editor to write full-time. She later moved to Watertown.

Her first solo work, This Must Be Love (a retelling of A Midsummer Night's Dream), was published in 2004. Sutherland wrote books under her actual name (or an initialized variation) and under pseudonyms and pen names, including Tamara Summers, Heather Williams, and Rob Kidd.

After releasing the eighth and final installment in her dog-oriented Pet Trouble series, Sutherland pitched the editing team at Scholastic Inc. about writing an epic fantasy series starring dragons as the heroes. With Amanda Maciel as her editor, the first Wings of Fire book was released on July 1, 2012, to generally positive critical reviews, as did subsequent entries; the series gradually amassed a substantial cult following and became an international bestseller.

Personal life 
Sutherland grew up sharing original ideas and exploring the classics with her younger sister Kari. She married her husband Adam in October 2007, and the two live in Watertown with their two sons.

Though she has generally refrained from revealing private details about her life in her frequent public events, Sutherland's religious background has been noted. Sutherland is known to borrow influences from a variety of religious traditions and backgrounds; she "attended a Baptist missionary school in Paraguay, studied Buddhism in college" and is raising her children with Judeo-Christian influences, having "married a wonderful Jewish man". Though she has woven philosophical and spiritual aspects from a variety of sources and traditions into her work, she has also said that "religion isn't something talked about as freely" in her daily life, instead hoping that her writing can open up discussions among readers and pose questions to contemplate in the freer, larger-than-life fantasy worlds she creates.

Sutherland has drawn inspiration from locations she has visited over the years, including the Waitomo Caves in New Zealand and the Amber Palace in India.

A long-time fan of Jeopardy!, she named the sixth dog in the Pet Trouble series after it. In 2009, she was a two-day champion on the show, winning a total of $46,200 over three episodes; the first two games she won by a fine margin, whereas she lost the latter game by not wagering enough money on the final clue; had she wagered everything, she would have won the game.

Books 

 Kermit's Mixed-Up Valentines (January 2, 2001, with Emily Sollinger; Out of Print)
 Meet Mo and Ella (February 1, 2001; Out of Print)
 Fun with Mo and Ella (February 1, 2002; Out of Print)
 Who Was Harry Houdini? (July 1, 2002, as Tui Sutherland)
 This Must Be Love (September 1, 2004; Out of Print)
 Avatars: So This Is How It Ends (October 1, 2006, Avatars Book #1; Out of Print)
 Pirates of the Caribbean: At World's End - The Junior Novelization (April 10, 2007, Pirates of the Caribbean Junior Book #3; Out of Print)
 He's With Me (May 1, 2007, as Tamara Summers; Out of Print)
 Warriors: Secrets of the Clans (May 29, 2007, as Erin Hunter, Warriors Companion Book #1)
 Nellie Oleson meets Laura Ingalls (September 1, 2007, as Heather Williams; Out of Print)
 Avatars: Shadow Falling (October 1, 2007, Avatars Book #2; Out of Print)
 Save the Date (April 29, 2008, as Tamara Summers; Out of Print)
 Seekers: The Quest Begins (May 27, 2008, as Erin Hunter, Seekers Book #1)
 Kingdom of Twilight (October 1, 2008, Avatars Book #3; Out of Print)
 Legends of the Brethren Court: The Caribbean (October 14, 2008, as Rob Kidd, Legends of the Brethren Court Book #1; Out of Print)
 Legends of the Brethren Court: The East (December 9, 2008, as Rob Kidd, Legends of the Brethren Court Book #2; Out of Print)
 Legends of the Brethren Court: The Turning Tide (March 17, 2009, as Rob Kidd, Legends of the Brethren Court Book #3; Out of Print)
 Pet Trouble: Runaway Retriever (April 1, 2009, as T.T. Sutherland, Pet Trouble Book #1)
 Pet Trouble: Loudest Beagle on the Block (April 1, 2009, as T.T. Sutherland, Pet Trouble Book #2)
 Seekers: Smoke Mountain (May 14, 2009, as Erin Hunter, Seekers Book #3)
 Pet Trouble: Mud-Puddle Poodle (July 1, 2009, as T.T. Sutherland, Pet Trouble Book #3)
 Legends of the Brethren Court: Wild Waters (August 18, 2009, as Rob Kidd, Legends of the Brethren Court Book #4; Out of Print)
 "Skittering" (Half-Minute Horrors, Short Story Anthology, August 25, 2009; Out of Print)
 Never Bite a Boy on the First Date (September 16, 2009, as Tamara Summers; Out of Print)
 Legends of the Brethren Court: Day of the Shadow (November 1, 2009, as Rob Kidd, Legends of the Brethren Court Book #5; Out of Print)
 Pet Trouble: Bulldog Won't Budge (November 1, 2009, as T.T. Sutherland, Pet Trouble Book #4)
 Pet Trouble: Oh No, Newf! (February 1, 2010, as T.T. Sutherland, Pet Trouble Book #5)
 Pet Trouble: Smarty-Pants Sheltie (May 1, 2010, as T.T. Sutherland, Pet Trouble Book #6)
 Seekers: Fire in the Sky (May 11, 2010, as Erin Hunter, Seekers Book #5)
 Pet Trouble: Bad to the Bone Boxer (August 1, 2010, as T.T. Sutherland, Pet Trouble Book #7)
 Pet Trouble: Dachshund Disaster (November 1, 2010, as T.T. Sutherland, Pet Trouble Book #8)
 Farmer Boy Goes West (February 14, 2012, as Heather Williams; Out of Print)
 Seekers: Return to the Wild (June 5, 2012, as Erin Hunter, Seekers: Return to the Wild Book #2)
 Wings of Fire: The Dragonet Prophecy (July 1, 2012, Wings of Fire Book #1)
 Wings of Fire: The Lost Heir (January 1, 2013, Wings of Fire Book #2)
 The Menagerie (March 12, 2013, with Kari Sutherland, The Menagerie Book #1)
 Wings of Fire: The Hidden Kingdom (May 28, 2013, Wings of Fire Book #3)
 Wings of Fire: The Dark Secret (October 29, 2013, Wings of Fire Book #4)
 "The Incredibly Important True Story of Me!" (Lucky Dog: Twelve Tales of Rescued Dogs, Short Story Anthology, January 28, 2014; Out of Print)
 The Menagerie: Dragon on Trial (March 11, 2014, with Kari Sutherland, The Menagerie Book #2)
 Wings of Fire: The Brightest Night (March 25, 2014, Wings of Fire Book #5)
 Spirit Animals: Against the Tide (September 30, 2014, Spirit Animals Book #5)
 Wings of Fire: Moon Rising (December 30, 2014, Wings of Fire Book #6)
 The Menagerie: Kraken on Trial (March 10, 2015, with Kari Sutherland, The Menagerie Book #3)
 Wings of Fire: Winglets #1 - Prisoners (March 31, 2015, Wings of Fire Short Story #1)
 Wings of Fire: Winter Turning (June 30, 2015, Wings of Fire Book #7)
 Wings of Fire: Winglets #2 - Assassin (September 29, 2015, Wings of Fire Short Story #2)
 Wings of Fire: Escaping Peril (December 29, 2015, Wings of Fire Book #8)
 Wings of Fire: Winglets #3 - Deserter (March 29, 2016, Wings of Fire Short Story #3)
 Wings of Fire: Legends - Darkstalker (June 28, 2016, Wings of Fire Legends Special Edition #1)
 Wings of Fire - A Winglets Collection: The First Three Stories (September 1, 2016, Wings of Fire Compilation of Prisoners, Assassin and Deserter; Limited Print)
 Wings of Fire: Winglets #4 - Runaway (September 27, 2016, Wings of Fire Short Story #4)
 Wings of Fire: Talons of Power (December 27, 2016, Wings of Fire Book #9)
 Wings of Fire: Darkness of Dragons (July 25, 2017, Wings of Fire Book #10)
 Wings of Fire - The Graphic Novel: The Dragonet Prophecy (January 2, 2018, with Mike Holmes, Wings of Fire Graphic Novel #1)
 Wings of Fire: The Lost Continent (June 26, 2018, Wings of Fire Book #11)
 Wings of Fire: The Hive Queen (December 26, 2018, Wings of Fire Book #12)
 Wings of Fire - The Graphic Novel: The Lost Heir (February 26, 2019, with Mike Holmes, Wings of Fire Graphic Novel #2)
 Wings of Fire: The Winglets Flip Book (April 27, 2019, Wings of Fire Compilation of Assassin and Deserter; Limited Print)
 Wings of Fire: The Poison Jungle (July 30, 2019, Wings of Fire Book #13)
 Wings of Fire - The Graphic Novel: The Hidden Kingdom (October 15, 2019, with Mike Holmes, Wings of Fire Graphic Novel #3)
 Wings of Fire: Legends - Dragonslayer (March 3, 2020, Wings of Fire Legends Special Edition #2)
 Wings of Fire: The Winglets Quartet - The First Four Stories (October 6, 2020, Wings of Fire Compilation of Prisoners, Assassin, Deserter and Runaway)
 Wings of Fire - The Graphic Novel: The Dark Secret (December 29, 2020, with Mike Holmes, Wings of Fire Graphic Novel #4)
 Wings of Fire: The Dangerous Gift (March 2, 2021, Wings of Fire Book #14)
 Wings of Fire: Forge Your Dragon World (May 4, 2021, with Mike Holmes, Wings of Fire Activity Book)
 Wings of Fire - The Graphic Novel: The Brightest Night (December 28, 2021 with Mike Holmes, Wings of Fire Graphic Novel #5)
 Wings of Fire: The Flames of Hope (April 5, 2022, Wings of Fire Book #15)
 Wings of Fire: The Official Coloring Book (April 5, 2022, with Brianna C. Walsh, Wings of Fire Activity Book)
 Wings of Fire - The Graphic Novel: Moon Rising (December 27, 2022, with Mike Holmes, Wings of Fire Graphic Novel #6)
 Wings of Fire: A Guide to the Dragon World (October 3, 2023, Wings of Fire Companion Book)
 Wings of Fire: How to Draw (November 7, 2023, with Brianna C. Walsh, Wings of Fire Activity Book)
 Wings of Fire - The Graphic Novel: Winter Turning (TBA with Mike Holmes, Wings of Fire Graphic Novel #7)
 Wings of Fire - The Graphic Novel: Escaping Peril (TBA with Mike Holmes, Wings of Fire Graphic Novel #8)
 Wings of Fire - The Graphic Novel: Talons of Power (TBA with Mike Holmes, Wings of Fire Graphic Novel #9)
 Wings of Fire - The Graphic Novel: Darkness of Dragons (TBA with Mike Holmes, Wings of Fire Graphic Novel #10)
Note: All books credited as Tui T. Sutherland unless otherwise stated.

References

External links 

 
 
 

American children's writers
1978 births
Living people
Jeopardy! contestants
Warriors (novel series)
Williams College alumni
Venezuelan emigrants to the United States
American women children's writers
People from Caracas
21st-century pseudonymous writers
Pseudonymous women writers
Fantasy writers